George Daniel Mostow (July 4, 1923 – April 4, 2017) was an American mathematician, renowned for his contributions to Lie theory. He was the Henry Ford II (emeritus) Professor of Mathematics at Yale University, a member of the National Academy of Sciences, the 49th president of the American Mathematical Society (1987–1988), and a trustee of the Institute for Advanced Study from 1982 to 1992.

The rigidity phenomenon for lattices in Lie groups he discovered and explored is known as Mostow rigidity. His work on rigidity played an essential role in the work of three Fields medalists, namely Grigori Margulis, William Thurston, and Grigori Perelman. 
In 1993 he was awarded the American Mathematical Society's Leroy P. Steele Prize for Seminal Contribution to Research. In 2013, he was awarded the Wolf Prize in Mathematics "for his fundamental and pioneering contribution to geometry and Lie group theory."

Biography 

George (Dan) Mostow was born in 1923 in Boston, Massachusetts.  His parents were Jews from Ukraine who immigrated to the United States in the early 20th century.

He received his Ph.D. from Harvard University in 1948, with a thesis written under the supervision of Garrett Birkhoff. His academic appointments had been at Syracuse University from 1949 to 1952, at Johns Hopkins University from 1952 to 1961, and at Yale University from 1961 until his retirement in 1999.

Mostow was elected to the National Academy of Sciences in 1974, served as the President of the American Mathematical Society in 1987 and 1988, and was a Trustee of the Institute for Advanced Study in Princeton, New Jersey from 1982 to 1992. He was awarded the AMS Leroy P. Steele Prize for Seminal Contribution to Research in 1993 for his book Strong rigidity of locally symmetric spaces (1973). He died on April 4, 2017.

See also 

 Strong rigidity
 Superrigidity
 Hochschild–Mostow group

References 

 Science 20 October 1978: Vol. 202. no. 4365, pp. 297–298.
 Pierre Deligne and Daniel Mostow, Commensurabilities among lattices in PU(1,n). Annals of Mathematics Studies, 132. Princeton University Press, 1993 
 Roger Howe, editor, Discrete groups in geometry and analysis. Papers in Honor of G. D. Mostow on His Sixtieth Birthday (Conference held at Yale University, New Haven, CT, USA, March 23–25, 1986), Progress in Mathematics, Vol. 67. Birkhäuser, Boston–Basel–Stuttgart 
 George Mostow, Strong rigidity of locally symmetric spaces, Annals of Mathematics Studies, no. 78, Princeton University Press, Princeton, 1973
 Alexander Lubotzky, Tannaka duality for discrete groups. American Journal of Mathematics Vol. 102, pp. 663 – 689, 1980

External links 
 AMS Presidents: A Timeline at the American Mathematical Society website.

1923 births
2017 deaths
20th-century American mathematicians
21st-century American mathematicians
American people of Ukrainian-Jewish descent
Members of the United States National Academy of Sciences
Presidents of the American Mathematical Society
Wolf Prize in Mathematics laureates
Harvard University alumni
Yale University faculty
Syracuse University faculty
Johns Hopkins University faculty
People from Boston
Mathematicians from Massachusetts
Mathematicians from New York (state)